Lawrence Zazzo (born December 15, 1970 in Philadelphia) is an American countertenor. His repertoire includes roles in many Baroque operas and oratorios, as well as works of the 20th century. He lives in England.

Education and background 

In his childhood Zazzo took part in school drama productions and choirs, including the Philadelphia Boys Choir & Chorale, and also performed as the magician “The Great Zazzini” for smaller children in the neighbourhood. After his voice had broken, he noticed that he had kept his alto voice in the falsetto register and began to develop it. He sang in numerous barbershop ensembles, high school madrigal and a cappella choirs. This led to his decision to study English and Music at Yale University (1989–93) and at King's College, Cambridge, England, (1993–95).
Zazzo envisaged a career as a conductor, a concert singer or as an academic (and in fact, Zazzo completed a PhD in Musicology at Queen's University (2015) on Handel's oratorios, which he researched for six years in between singing engagements). While he was completing his vocal studies at the "Royal College of Music" in London (1995–97), he made his debut as Oberon in Benjamin Britten's "A Midsummer Night’s Dream". The same year he sang the title role in George Frederic Handel's "Arminio" at the London Handel Festival. This was the beginning of his opera career which developed rapidly.

In 2017, Zazzo joined Newcastle University as Head of Performance and Lecturer in Music.

Performance 

Zazzo has worked with numerous conductors including René Jacobs, William Christie, Nikolaus Harnoncourt, Ivor Bolton, Christopher Hogwood, Trevor Pinnock, Christophe Rousset, Harry Bicket, Emmanuelle Haïm, Harry Christophers, Paul Goodwin, Péter Eötvös, Rinaldo Alessandrini, Hervé Niquet, Jean-Claude Malgoire, Jordi Savall, James Conlon and others for many opera houses and concert halls.

His major operatic roles include Giulio Cesare in Handel's Giulio Cesare (Metropolitan Opera New York, La Monnaie Brussels, Netherlands Opera Amsterdam, Paris National Opera, English National Opera London, Concertgebouw Amsterdam, Semperoper Dresden), Orfeo in Gluck's Orfeo ed Euridice (Oslo Opera House, Canadian Opera Company Toronto, Reisopera Netherlands), Radamisto in Handel's Radamisto (English National Opera London), and Gualtiero in Scarlatti's Griselda (Berlin State Opera). He performed the title roles in Sosarme (Teatro Nacional de São Carlos), in Alessandro (Karlsruhe), in Orlando (Cardiff, Bristol, London) and in Solomon (Royal Opera House London).

He also appeared as Ottone in Handel's Agrippina (La Monnaie Brussels, Théâtre des Champs-Élysées Paris, Frankfurt Opera), as Ottone in Monteverdi's L'incoronazione di Poppea (Bavarian and Berlin State Opera, Theater an der Wien and La Monnaie), as Goffredo in Handel's Rinaldo (Berlin State Opera, Opéra National de Montpellier, Zürich Opera House), as Farnace in Mozart's Mitridate, re di Ponto (Bavarian State Opera Munich), and as Ruggerio in Vivaldi's Orlando furioso (Frankfurt Opera). He was Cardenio in Francesco Bartolomeo Conti's Don Chisciotte in Sierra Morena (Theater an der Wien). He sang the alto part in Purcell's semi-opera The Fairy-Queen (Berliner Philharmonie) and the role of Arsace in Partenope (Théâtre des Champs-Élysées Paris, Ferrol, Amsterdam, Pamplona, Essen and Madrid). In the German premiere of Francesco Cavalli's Veremonda, he appeared as Delio (Rokokotheater Schwetzingen, Staatstheater Mainz). He performed the role of Arsamene in Handel's Serse (Frankfurt Opera), Unulfo in Handel's Rodelinda (Teatro Real Madrid) and Bertarido in Rodelinda Opéra National de Lyon.

His repertoire includes numerous oratorios by Georg Friedrich Händel, for example Messiah (Shanghai Opera, Notre Dame Cathedral, Konzerthaus, Vienna, Winchester Cathedral, Munich Residenz), Semele (Kölner Philharmonie, Concertgebouw, Concertzaal Gent), Theodora (Chan Centre for the Performing Arts Vancouver, Théâtre des Champs-Élysées, Theater an der Wien), Jephtha (Stefaniensaal Graz), Acis and Galatea (Théâtre des Champs-Élysées, Theater an der Wien), Samson (Beaune, Namur), Saul (Beaune, Namur) – He performed the alto parts in Bach's St Matthew Passion (Harris Theater (Chicago), Ambronay, De Doelen Rotterdam) and St John Passion (Chicago, Kölner Philharmonie, Leeds).

He has also appeared in several roles in contemporary works, among others as Oberon in Britten's A Midsummer Night's Dream (Opéra National de Lyon, Canadian Opera Company Toronto, Teatro all 'Opera di Roma, Aix-en-Provence Festival, Poly Theater Beijing, Hamburg State Opera), as Trinculo in The Tempest (Royal Opera House Covent Garden), as the Refugee in Flight (Glyndebourne Festival) and as Masha in Tri sestry (Three Sisters) (Opéra National de Lyon, La Monnaie, Theater an der Wien). He sang the role of Odysseus in the world premiere of Sirenen – Bilder des Begehrens und des Vernichtens by Rolf Riehm (Frankfurt Opera). Furthermore he sang in the world premiere performance of Riehm's The Deaths of Orpheus and of Geoff Page's monodrama Paradise Lost based on John Milton's Paradise Lost.

Discography 

 1995 Celebration of the Spirit, incl. Leonard Bernsteins "Chichester Psalms", DVD (Brilliant Classics) an CD (Columns Classics)
 1995 Gloria (Brilliant Classics)
 1996 Arianna, live-recording (NMC Records)
 1996 Stabat Mater, CD (Brilliant Classics) and DVD (United Classics)
 2001 Deborah, live recording (Naxos)
 2003 Griselda (Harmonia Mundi)
 2003 Rinaldo (Harmonia Mundi)
 2004 Lotario (highlights), live recording (Oehms Classics)
 2004 Serse (Virgin Classics)
 2005 Partenope (Chandos Records)
 2005 Saul (Harmonia Mundi)
 2006 Messiah (Harmonia Mundi)
 2007 Byrdland with the Paragon Saxophon Quartett (Landor)
 2007 Fernando (Virgin Classics)
 2008 Duetti amorosi with Nuria Rial (Harmonia Mundi)
 2008 Riccardo Primo (Harmonia Mundi)
 2010 Athalia (Harmonia Mundi)
 2011 Lunarcy with Shizuku Noiri (lute) (Evil Penguin Records)
 2012 Alessandro, live-recording (Pan Classics)
 2012 Apollo et Hyacinthus (Linn Records)
 2012 Giulio Cesare, live-DVD (Virgin Classics)
 2012 Mozart In-Between (Sony Classical Records)
 2014: Mitridate, re di Ponto (Signum Records)
 2014: A Royal Trio (Harmonia Mundi USA)
 2014: Messiah (BR-Klassik)
 2018: Xerxes, Live-blu-ray (UNITEL)
 2019: The Orchestral Music of Jonathan Dove (Orchid Classics)
 2019: Gender Stories (Deutsche Harmonia Mundi)
 2019: Handel uncaged (Inventa Records)
 2020: Samson, live recording (Ricercar)

References 
Official biography

External links 
 
 Management HarrisonParrott

1970 births
Living people
Operatic countertenors
American performers of early music
Musicians from Philadelphia
21st-century American male opera singers
Classical musicians from Pennsylvania